Heteroglenea is a genus of longhorn beetles of the subfamily Lamiinae, containing the following species:

 Heteroglenea bastiensis (Breuning, 1956)
 Heteroglenea dolosa Lin & Yang, 2009
 Heteroglenea fissilis (Breuning, 1953)
 Heteroglenea gemella Lin & Yang, 2009
 Heteroglenea glechoma (Pascoe, 1867)
 Heteroglenea mediodiscoprolongata (Breuning, 1964)
 Heteroglenea momeitensis (Breuning, 1956)
 Heteroglenea nigromaculata (Thomson, 1865)
 Heteroglenea vicinalis Lin & Yang, 2009

References

Saperdini